Saint Athanasia of Aegina (c.790 in Aegina – 14 August 860 in Timia, Greece) was a saint who worked in the Byzantine Empire and was for a while adviser to the Empress Theodora II.

She served as an abbess and was known for her miraculous healing of the sick and those seen as possessed.

Life
The life of St. Athanasia is contained only in a vitae which is found in the manuscript Vaticanus Graecus 1660 of 916 CE. The author is unknown. However, scholars believe it was most likely a man, due to the masculine tenses found in the piece, and that it was written soon after St. Athanasia's death.

St. Athanasia was the daughter of Christian nobles, Niketas and Irene, and experienced the mystical union of a star merging with her heart while weaving at the loom when she was a young girl. She wanted a spiritual life, but an imperial edict required all single women of marriageable age to marry soldiers. At 16 years old, at her parents urging, she complied and married a young officer. Sixteen days after her wedding, her husband was killed in a battle with raiding Arabs. She again married, this time to a deeply religious man who wished to become a monk and left to do so with her blessing.

St. Athanasia then gave away the bulk of her possessions, converted their home into a convent, and began building churches. She served as an abbess and was known for her miraculous healing of the sick and those seen as possessed. Her community later moved to Timia near the ancient church of Stephen the Protomartyr. Here crowds flocked to see her. As her fame grew, she moved to Constantinople seeking solitude as an anchoress in a cell for seven years. While walled away, she was an adviser to the Empress Theodora II. After seven years, she returned to Aegina where she died of natural causes three days later at Timia on 14 August 860.

Her relics are preserved at Timia in a specially made reliquary, and they are revered for their reputed healing powers.

Romani people
Contemporary scholars have suggested that one of the first written references to the Romani people, under the term "Atsinganoi" (Greek), dates from the Byzantine era during a time of famine in the 9th century. In 800 CE, St. Athanasia gave food to "foreigners called the Atsinganoi" near Thrace.

See also
 Saint Athanasia of Aegina, patron saint archive

References

External links
Saints Index at SQPN a multimedia organization specializing in the production of audio and video programs faithful to the teachings of the Roman Catholic Church. Accessed August 2008.
 Holy Women of Byzantium: Ten Saints’ Lives in English Translation Edited by Elizabeth Mary Talbot, Published by Dumbarton Oaks Research Library and Collection, (1996) Washington, D.C.
Saints' Lives Summaries University of Kentucky. Accessed August 2008.
Santiebeati

8th-century births
860 deaths
9th-century Christian saints
Saints of medieval Greece
9th-century Byzantine people
People from Aegina
Miracle workers